Christine Lee "Christy" Morgan (born October 13, 1963 in Norristown, Pennsylvania) is an American former field hockey player who competed in the 1988 Summer Olympics.

Currently, Christy is head coach for women's field hockey at James Madison University.

College
While at Old Dominion, Donnelly won the Honda Award (now the Honda Sports Award) as the nation's best field hockey player for the 1984–85 season.

References

External links
 

1963 births
Living people
American female field hockey players
Olympic field hockey players of the United States
Field hockey players at the 1988 Summer Olympics
People from Norristown, Pennsylvania
21st-century American women
Old Dominion Monarchs field hockey players